Chesterfield Gorge Natural Area, also known as Chesterfield Gorge State Wayside, is a  state park on Route 9 in Chesterfield, New Hampshire. The park conserves a rocky gorge with waterfalls on Wilde Brook. There is picnicking, a seasonal visitor center, and  trail on either side of the brook.

The park owes its existence to local farmer George White, who bought the gorge in 1936 to protect it from clear-cut loggers. White sold  to the Society for the Protection of New Hampshire Forests, which then donated the land to the state. As Chesterfield Gorge Wayside Picnic Area, the park dates from 1948.

References

External links
Chesterfield Gorge Natural Area, New Hampshire Department of Natural and Cultural Resources
Hidden Gems of New Hampshire: Chesterfield Gorge, New Hampshire Division of Parks and Recreation

State parks of New Hampshire
Parks in Cheshire County, New Hampshire
Chesterfield, New Hampshire
Canyons and gorges of the United States
Landforms of Cheshire County, New Hampshire